Semisulcospira kurodai is a species of freshwater snail with an operculum, an aquatic gastropod mollusk in the family Semisulcospiridae. Prior to 2009, this species was classified in the family Pleuroceridae.

Distribution 
This species occurs in Japan.

Description 

The diploid chromosome number of Semisulcospira kurodai is 2n=35 and 2n=36 (both chromosome numbers were observed).

Ecology

Habitat 
Semisulcospira kurodai lives in rivers and in ponds.

Life cycle 
The female has 17 to 72 embryos in its brood pouch. One female can give life to 62 to 79 newborn snails in the laboratory.

Semisulcospira kurodai can live up to four years in the laboratory.

References

Further reading 
  Goto T. (1994). "岐阜県のクロダカワニナ [Semisulcospira kurodai Kajiyama & Habe in Gifu Prefecture]". ちりぼたん The Chiribotan 24(3-4): 100-101. CiNii
 Oniwa K. & Kimura M. (1986). "Genetic variability and relationships in six snail species of the genus Semisulcospira". The Japanese journal of genetics 61(5): 503-514. CiNii. 
  Takami A. (1995). "31. クロダカワニナの産仔数, 新生貝の大きさと成長(平成 6 年度大会(豊橋)研究発表要旨) [31. Number, size and growth of newborns in Semisulcospira kurodai under the laboratory conditions (Abstracts of Papers Presented at the 1995 Annual Meeting in Toyohashi City)]". Venus 54(1): 96. CiNii
  Takami A. (1991). "カワニナ属 3 種の産仔頻度, 産仔数と新生貝の大きさ [The Birth Frequency, Number and Size of Newborns in the Three Species of the Genus Semisulcospira (Prosobranchia: Pleuroceridae)]". Venus 50(3): 218-232. CiNii.

External links

Semisulcospiridae